Kent L. Norman is an American cognitive psychologist and an expert on computer rage. He graduated from Southern Methodist University in 1969 and earned a Ph.D. in experimental psychology from the University of Iowa in 1973.

Norman was an associate professor of Psychology at the University of Maryland, College Park. He retired January 2018.

In 1983, Norman co-founded the Laboratory for Automation Psychology and Decision Processes (LAPDP) as an affiliate of the Human-Computer Interaction Laboratory (HCIL) and the University of Maryland Institute for Advanced Computer Studies (UMIACS).  The LAPDP studies the cognitive side of the human/computer interface, with an emphasis on the processes of judgment and decision making.  Research in the LAPDP has received corporate support from AT&T, Sperry, and IBM and United States federal agency support from NASA, NSF, NRL, and the U.S. Census Bureau.

Norman designed and wrote the HyperCourseware software system, in 1990, for the preparation and presentation of materials and the processes of education in a virtual learning environment.  HyperCourseware has been utilized in the multimedia Teaching Theaters at the University of Maryland, College Park.

In 1997, Norman worked with the Center for the Design of Distance Education Methodology at the Open University of Israel and collaborated on new methods of Internet distance education.

Books written
Norman, K. L. (1991). The psychology of menu selection:  Designing cognitive control at the human/computer interface. Norwood, N.J.: Ablex Publishing Corporation.
Norman, K. L. (1997). Teaching in the switched-on classroom:  An introduction to electronic education and HyperCourseware.  College Park, MD:  Laboratory for Automation Psychology. (http://www.lap.umd.edu/SOC/)

Teaching
Norman is a retired Associate Professor of Psychology, University of Maryland, College Park and lead scientist of the LAPDP..  He teaches courses on cyberpsychology, human-computer interaction, the psychology of video games, and the psychology of social networks and social computing.

See also
Computer rage

References

External links
Laboratory for Automation Psychology and Decision Processes
HyperCourseware at cognitron.umd.edu
Graffiti as Interface Objects

American cognitive scientists
Living people
Southern Methodist University alumni
University of Iowa alumni
Year of birth missing (living people)